Acmispon rubriflorus, synonym Lotus rubriflorus, is a species of legume endemic to California. It is known by the common name red-flowered bird's-foot trefoil. It is known from only four occurrences with a disjunct distribution.

Location
There are two occurrences in eastern Stanislaus County, California, near Mount Boardman, and the other two occurrences are in Colusa and Tehama Counties over 100 miles to the north. The plant's habitat is grassland and woodland.

Description
This is a petite annual herb spreading in a small patch on the ground. Its slender branches are lined with leaves each made up of about 4 hairy lance-shaped leaflets. Solitary magenta flowers appear in the leaf axils, each minute pea-shaped bloom just a few millimeters wide. The fruit is a hairy legume pod which may approach a centimeter in length.

References

External links
Jepson Manual Treatment
USDA Plants Profile
Range map & photos at CalFlora

rubriflorus
Endemic flora of California